Vietinghoff is a surname. People with that name include:

 Egon von Vietinghoff (1903-1994), German-Swiss painter, author and philosopher, son of Jeanne
 Heinrich von Vietinghoff (1887-1952), German general of the Wehrmacht during World War II
 Jeanne de Vietinghoff (1875-1926), Belgian writer, mother of Egon

See also
 Baron Boris Vietinghoff-Scheel (-1901), Russian composer